The men's individual épée competition at the 2018 Asian Games in Jakarta was held on 19 August at the Jakarta Convention Center.

Schedule
All times are Western Indonesia Time (UTC+07:00)

Results 
Legend
DNS — Did not start

Preliminaries

Pool A

Pool B

Pool C

Pool D

Pool E

Summary

Knockout round

Final

Top half

Bottom half

Final standing

References

Results

External links
Fencing at the 2018 Asian Games - Men's individual épée

Men's individual épée